Allur  is a Town it is the Nagara panchayat in Nellore district of the Indian state of Andhra Pradesh. It is under the administration of Kavali revenue division and the headquarters are located at Allur.

Geography 
Allur mandal is bounded by Bogole Mandal towards North, Vidavalur Mandal towards South, Dagadarthi Mandal towards west Kodavalur Mandal towards South.

Government 
Allur was also originally part of Nellore taluk. Kovur taluk was created from Nellore in 1910 and Allur became part of it. These taluks were reorganized as mandals in 1985 and Allur became a mandal.

Towns and villages 

 census, the mandal has 15 settlements and all are villages.

The settlements in the mandal are listed below:

Demographics 
 the population of Allur mandal was 52,602 with 74,853 households. Male population is 26,272 and females are 26,330 and children are 5,622. The average literacy rate stands at 63.51% with 29,836 literates.

See also
Beeramgunta Poleramma Temple

References 

Mandals in Nellore district